Pereselenets is a rural locality (a station) in Mukhinsky Selsoviet of Shimanovsky District, Amur Oblast, Russia. The population was 1 as of 2018.

Geography 
It is located 63 km north-west from Shimanovsk.

References 

Rural localities in Shimanovsky District